Rahul Asher (born 18 February 1979) is an Indian-born cricket umpire based in Oman. In July 2017, Asher was selected to umpire in matches in the Under-19 Cricket World Cup qualification tournament in Singapore. In October 2018, he was one of the umpires who officiated in matches in the 2018 ICC World Cricket League Division Three tournament in Oman. In April 2018, he was appointed to the Development Panel of ICC Umpires.

In January 2019, Asher stood in his first Twenty20 International (T20I) match, in the fixture between Qatar and Saudi Arabia in the 2019 ACC Western Region T20 tournament. In February 2019, he was one of two umpires to join ICC officials for the 2018–19 Oman Quadrangular Series. In January 2020, he stood in his first One Day International (ODI) match, in the opening fixture of the 2020 Oman Tri-Nation Series, between Oman and the United Arab Emirates.

In January 2022, he was named as one of the on-field umpires for the 2022 ICC Under-19 Cricket World Cup in the West Indies.

See also
 List of One Day International cricket umpires
 List of Twenty20 International cricket umpires

References

1979 births
Living people
Omani One Day International cricket umpires
Omani Twenty20 International cricket umpires
People from Kozhikode
Indian emigrants to Oman
Indian expatriates in Oman